Siegfried Graetschus (9 June 1916 – 14 October 1943) was a German SS functionary at the Sobibor extermination camp during Operation Reinhard, the deadliest phase of the Holocaust in occupied Poland. He was assassinated by a prisoner during the Sobibor uprising.

Graetschus joined the SS in 1935 and the Nazi Party in 1936. He served at Bernburg Euthanasia Centre and Treblinka extermination camp before being posted to Sobibor in August 1942.  He succeeded Erich Lachmann as commander of the approximately 200 Ukrainian Trawniki guards at Sobibor.

Graetschus was killed during the prisoner revolt at Sobibor. While sources agree that he was killed in the shoemaker's barracks with an axe to the head, they differ as to whether the fatal blow was struck by Yehuda Lerner, a Varsovian Jew, or by Arkady Wajspapir, a Jewish Russian Red Army soldier.

References 

1916 births
1943 deaths
People from Tilsit
People from East Prussia
SS non-commissioned officers
Axe murder
Nazi Party members
Sobibor personnel killed during the Sobibor uprising